Yaribieh (also Romanized as Yaribi‘eh; also known as Yorbī‘ī, Yorebey‘ī, Yowrabī‘eh, and Yowraybīyeh) is a village in Gheyzaniyeh Rural District, in the Central District of Ahvaz County, Khuzestan Province, Iran. At the 2006 census, its population was 21, in 4 families.

References 

Populated places in Ahvaz County